Toska is a  former village in Municipality of Struga, North Macedonia.

Name
The name of the village is an Albanian toponym derived from the term Tosk, which denotes a subgroup of southern Albanians.

Demographics 
During the 1953 and 1961 census, the settlement of Toska and its inhabitants were counted as being part of the village of Gorno Tateši and its inhabitants. The 1971 Yugoslav census was the last to record any people as residing in the village which contained 69 inhabitants, all Albanians.

References

Villages in Struga Municipality
Albanian communities in North Macedonia